The Nevada Department of Education or NDOE, autonomous of the governor and the Nevada State Legislature, administers primary and secondary public education in the state of Nevada.

The NDOE headquarters are located in Carson City.

History 
The Department of Education was established in 1979, and initially consisted of three boards of commissions: the state board of education, the state board for vocational education, and the state textbook. Several changes to the structure occurred in the 1980s. The textbook commission ceased to exist in 1981, while the state board for vocational education was renamed in 1985 into the state board for occupational education.

In 1995, the commission on post-secondary education was moved to the Department of Education from the Department of Business and Industry, though this only lasted until 2001, when the commission was disbanded. By 2017, only the state board of education remained alongside the Superintendent of Public Instruction. Several advisory councils and boards were formed in the following years, some which make up the current structure of the Department of Education.

Divisions 
The following are several divisions that are included in the Department of Education:

 Student Investment Division
 Educator Effectiveness and Family Engagement Division
 Student Achievement Division

The department also has several active statutory boards, commissions, and task force such as the Council to Establish Academic Standards, Nevada Early Childhood Advisory Council, Commission on Professional Standards, and Teacher Recruitment and Retention Advisory Task Force.

Functions
Teacher licenses - NDOE licenses all primary and secondary school teachers in Nevada.

See also 

 List of Nevada state agencies
 United States Department of Education

References

External links 
Nevada Department of Education

Education
Organizations based in Carson City, Nevada
Public education in Nevada
State departments of education of the United States
Education in Carson City, Nevada